|}

The Tapster Stakes is a Listed flat horse race in Great Britain open to horses aged four years or older.
It is run at Goodwood over a distance of 1 mile 3 furlongs and 218 yards (2,412 metres), and it is scheduled to take place each year in May.

The race was first run in 2007.

Records

Most successful horse (2 wins):
Mirage Dancer (2018, 2019)

Leading jockey (3 wins):
Frankie Dettori – Holberg (2010), Passion For Gold (2011), Gatewood (2014)

Leading trainer (3 wins):
 Sir Michael Stoute  – Sea Moon (2012), Mirage Dancer (2018, 2019)
 Roger Varian - Ayrad (2015), Mount Logan (2016), Third Realm (2022)

Winners

See also 
Horse racing in Great Britain
List of British flat horse races

References
Racing Post:

Open middle distance horse races
Goodwood Racecourse
Flat races in Great Britain
Recurring sporting events established in 2007
2007 establishments in England